The Codorus Navigation Company, based in York in south-central Pennsylvania, was formed in 1829 to make a navigable waterway along Codorus Creek from York, Pennsylvania to the Susquehanna River, a distance of .

The first  of the system were finished in 1832, allowing boats named Codorus and Pioneer to run passenger excursions between York and Barnitz's Springs. After the entire system was opened to boats, arks, and rafts in 1833, the first ark to reach York carried  of lumber and 100 passengers, and later arrivals brought such cargo as stone, coal, and shingles. 

Plans originally included a second canal from the mouth of Codorus Creek along the Susquehanna to calm water above Chestnut Ripples. This would have made entrance into the Codorus system easier for craft coming down the river, but the extension canal, though started, was never finished. Competition from the York and Maryland Railroad, which connected York to Baltimore by 1838, and the Wrightsville, York and Gettysburg Railroad, which began operations in 1840, put the Codorus canal out of business by about 1850. 

Codorus Navigation was one of several privately funded canals such as the Union Canal that operated in Pennsylvania during the same era as the Pennsylvania Canal. Though the canal fell into disuse in the middle of the 19th century, parts of its graded towpath, once used by the mules that pulled the boats, are becoming part of a rail trail along Codorus Creek between York and John Rudy County Park. Construction began on the trail extension in 2006.

Points of interest

See also
 List of canals in the United States

References

External links
 American Canal Society
 National Canal Museum
 Pennsylvania Canal Society
 Rail Trail, Greenmesh (Paul Kuehnel)

Canals in Pennsylvania
Canals opened in 1833
Transportation buildings and structures in York County, Pennsylvania